Anthony Leo Rougier (born 17 July 1971) is a Trinidadian former footballer. A former international with 67 caps to his name, he came close to making the 2006 FIFA World Cup team for Trinidad and Tobago.

He played for La Brea Angels, Trintoc, United Petrotrin, and Trinity Pros, before signing with Scottish club Raith Rovers in March 1995. He helped the club to the First Division title in 1994–95, before joining Hibernian in July 1997 for a £250,000 fee. He helped "Hibs" to secure the First Division title in 1998–99, before he was sold on to English club Port Vale for £175,000 in January 1999. He moved on to Reading for £325,000 in August 2000, and helped the "Royals" to promotion out of the Second Division in 2000–01. He switched to Brentford in May 2003, before joining Bristol City in March 2004. He then had spells in China with Nanjing Yoyo and in America with Rochester Rhinos, before returning to Trinidad to play for United Petrotrin, North East Stars, and FC South End.

Club career
Starting his career in his native Trinidad and Tobago with La Brea Angels, Trintoc, United Petrotrin, and Trinity Pros, Rougier switched the Caribbean for Raith Rovers of Kirkcaldy, Scotland in March 1995. He would have signed for Bradford City, but could not secure a work permit in time.

He spent the first half of 1998–99 with Hibernian, playing eighteen games and scoring once against Morton. It would prove to be an easy campaign for Alex McLeish's "Hibs", as they eventually finished 23 points clear of second place Falkirk. Rougier was not at Easter Road for the celebrations, however, having been sold to English club Port Vale for £175,000 in January 1999. He arrived at Vale Park with the club about to suffer a drastic downturn in fortunes as chairman Bill Bell replaced manager John Rudge with Brian Horton. He made twelve appearances for Vale at the end of the season. Rougier scored nine goals in 41 games in 1999–2000, becoming a crowd favourite and the club's top scorer, but it was not enough to prevent the "Valiants" from losing their First Division status.

In August 2000 he was sold on to fellow Second Division side Reading for £325,000, signing a three-year contract. Reading got to the play-off final at the end of the 2000–01 season, but Rougier scored an own goal as they lost to Walsall after extra-time.

The following season, the club pushed for a second successive promotion, aiming for the Premier League. Rougier was loaned out to Brighton & Hove Albion late in the season, scoring twice for the "Seagulls" in six appearances, leading to speculation of a permanent transfer. Returning to the Madejski Stadium in time for the play-offs, he played a part of the semi-final second leg, replacing Darius Henderson after 64 minutes. Eventual play-off winners Wolverhampton Wanderers beat Reading 3–1 on aggregate. At the end of the campaign, Rougier was not offered a new contract, and instead signed with Brentford.

Rougier played 34 games for Brentford in the 2003–04 season before switching to Bristol City in late March. On 2 May, his 21st-minute winner over Barnsley proved not enough to catch Queens Park Rangers, though the club had easily qualified for the play-offs. He scored the opener of the semi-final with Hartlepool United at Victoria Park, City winning 2–1 on aggregate, before falling 1–0 at the Millennium Stadium to his old club Brighton. He was then released by City.

After a short spell with Chinese club Nanjing Yoyo and speculation of signing with Northampton Town in September 2005, he spent a brief period in the USA with USL Pro club Rochester Rhinos. He ended his playing career back in Trinidad with United Petrotrin, before becoming Technical Advisor at North East Stars under manager David Farrell in 2008. In 2009, he co-founded FC South End, which is the newest club to compete in the TT Pro League. In July 2009, he registered himself as a player-coach in order to boost the fortunes of his struggling side.

International career
Rougier earned 67 caps for the Trinidad and Tobago national team between 1995 and 2005, scoring five goals. He served as captain on numerous occasions. During this time his country won the Caribbean Cup in 1996 and 1999, beating Cuba on home soil in the final on both occasions. They also reached the final in 1998, but were beaten 2–1 by Jamaica. He was also in the squad for the 1996 and 2000 editions of the CONCACAF Gold Cup.

He was on the 24-man shortlist for the squad for the 2006 FIFA World Cup, but was excluded from the final 23. Manager Leo Beenhakker said: "The guy worked fantastically and he did everything he had to do to try and make it and in the end I had to make a decision."

Personal life
A "proud and passionate Christian", Rougier used to celebrate goals with a prayer.

He advised good friend and fellow footballer Dwight Yorke to "calm down a bit with the ladies" following Yorke's love life being splashed across the British tabloids. He grew up next door to cricketer Gus Logie and worked at an airport in New York City before trying his luck with football in England.

Rougier is a lifelong teetotaler. On multiple occasions during his playing career, he was awarded a bottle of champagne for winning the man of the match award, only to refuse it and hand it back to the organisers.

His family include wife Trisha and daughters Alishia-Kae and Maya-Kai.

Career statistics

Club

International

References

1971 births
Living people
Trinidad and Tobago Christians
Trinidad and Tobago footballers
Trinidad and Tobago international footballers
Trinidad and Tobago expatriate footballers
Association football midfielders
United Petrotrin F.C. players
Expatriate footballers in Scotland
Raith Rovers F.C. players
Hibernian F.C. players
Expatriate footballers in England
Port Vale F.C. players
Reading F.C. players
Brighton & Hove Albion F.C. players
Brentford F.C. players
Bristol City F.C. players
Expatriate footballers in China
Nanjing Yoyo players
China League One players
Expatriate soccer players in the United States
Rochester New York FC players
North East Stars F.C. players
FC South End players
TT Pro League players
Scottish Football League players
English Football League players
USL First Division players
Trinidad and Tobago expatriate sportspeople in China
Trinidad and Tobago expatriate sportspeople in England
Trinidad and Tobago expatriate sportspeople in Scotland
Trinidad and Tobago expatriate sportspeople in the United States
1996 CONCACAF Gold Cup players
1998 CONCACAF Gold Cup players
2000 CONCACAF Gold Cup players